Friedrich Sass (6 January 1883 – 26 February 1968) was a German engineer, university professor and historian.

Life and career 

Friedrich Sass was born in Koldenbüttel and attended the Gymnasium (grammar school) in Schleswig. He studied mechanical engineering at the Technical University of Munich, and marine engineering at the Technical University of Berlin. After graduating from TU Berlin, Sass worked as a steam turbine designer at AEG from 1908. During World War I, Sass became the head of AEG's Diesel engine department, where he designed the double-acting piston two-stroke Diesel engine with air-blast-less, direct fuel injection; initially, it was intended for submarine use. In the 1920s, Sass continued his work on direct fuel injection systems; he was the first engineer to study the relation between the diameter of a fuel spray at the point of injection, and its cylinder intrusion. In 1940, Sass stopped working for AEG.

From 1927, Sass had been an untenured professor at TU Berlin, where he gave a lecture on direct-injected Diesel engines. In 1946, he became a tenured professor for Diesel engine design; on 31 March 1953, he was given emeritus status. From 1935 until 1952, Sass was a member of Germanischer Lloyd's board of directors.

On 2 April 1935, Sass obtained a patent on "Regulation means for internal combustion engines with injection without air and variable speed"  that he had filed on 28 August 1929;
 it has four claims.

In 1949, Friedrich Sass founded the scientific journal “Konstruktion”, of which he had been the editor until 1963. In 1962, Springer published Sass's work “Geschichte des deutschen Verbrennungsmotorenbaus von 1860 bis 1918”, which is considered the most important scientific work on the history of the internal combustion engine.

Works 

 Friedrich Sass, Charles Bouche: Dubbel: Taschenbuch für den Maschinenbau 11th edition, Springer, Berlin 1953, 
 Friedrich Sass, Charles Bouche: Dubbel: Taschenbuch für den Maschinenbau 12th edition, Springer, Berlin 1963, 
 Friedrich Sass: Bau und Betrieb von Dieselmaschinen: Ein Lehrbuch für Studierende. Erster Band: Grundlagen und Maschinenelemente, 2nd edition, Springer, Berlin/Heidelberg 1948, 
 Friedrich Sass: Bau und Betrieb von Dieselmaschinen Ein Lehrbuch für Studierende: Zweiter Band: Die Maschinen und Ihr Betrieb, 2nd edition, Springer, Berlin/Heidelberg 1957, 
 Friedrich Sass: Geschichte des deutschen Verbrennungsmotorenbaus von 1860 bis 1918, Springer, Berlin/Heidelberg 1962,

References 

1883 births
1968 deaths
20th-century German engineers
Engineers from Berlin
20th-century German inventors
People associated with the internal combustion engine
People from Nordfriesland
Academic staff of the Technical University of Berlin